

The Arafura Marine Park, about   north-east of Darwin, is Australia's most northern marine park, and is part of the North Network of Australian Marine Parks. The Aboriginal clans of  Mandilarri-Ildugij, the Mangalara, the Murran, the Gadura-Minaga and the Ngaynjaharr whose sea country this is, share some of the responsibilities for the park.

The park is managed as an IUCN category VI park with three zones (see figure 1): a  multiple use zone, a special purpose zone and a special purpose (trawl) zone. Important sections of the park (see figure 2) include the Money Shoal, which is an area of raised sea-bed, thought to have been produced by periods of coral reef growth during the Quaternary and differing sea levels.

Money Shoal 
Money Shoal carries an abundant and varied assemblage of coral and organisms associated with coral reefs, an abundance of hard corals in the shallows, filter feeders on the shoal margins, while in the deeper areas of the sediment plains, there is little to no benthos.

Money shoal gallery

Fauna
Taken from Galaiduk, et al. (2021)
Chelonia mydas (Green turtle)
Lepidochelys olivacea (Olive Ridley Turtle)
Carcharhinus sorrah (spot-tail shark)
Lutjanus malabaricus, Lutjanus erythropterus (red snappers)
Lutjanus sebae (red emperor)
Pristipomoides multidens (goldband snapper)

See also
Australian marine parks

References

Australian marine parks
Marine protected areas of Australia